Povilas Lukšys (21 August 1886 – 8 February 1919) was the first Lithuanian Army soldier who died for the independence of Lithuania in the Lithuanian Wars of Independence.

Biography 
During World War I, Lukšys served in the Imperial Russian Army. When the Lithuanian army began to be recreated as Lithuania regained its independence, Lukšys organized a group of volunteers. He was an officer of the Kėdainiai defence squad, the commander of the field guard as well as the deputy head of the reconnaissance squad. In the Kėdainiai county, Lukšys was involved in battles against Soviet Russian units that were attacking in the direction of Kaunas. 

Lukšys died on 8 February 1919 while carrying out a reconnaissance mission near the village of Taučiūnai, where a fierce shootout took place. Lukšys was buried in the Kėdainiai cemetery. Later, other volunteers who died for Lithuanian independence were also buried there.

Commemoration 

At the place of Lukšys' death, a monument was built in 1929 according to the plans of the architect Vytautas Landsbergis-Žemkalnis. The one-hectare plot of land where the monument is built was donated by Marijonas Vendziagolskis, the owner of Taučiūnai Manor (who bought it from a farmer and later donated it "for public use").

The monument reached  in height. Its shape symbolized the triangular sign of the volunteers and the three terraces represented the three colors of the national flag of Lithuania. The granite pyramid itself represented eternity. A staircase was installed in the middle of the lower terrace, and the Vytis cross with oak branches and the inscription was carved on the front plane of the pyramid: "On 9 February 1919 volunteer soldier Povilas Lukšys died here in battles with the Russian Red Army – the first victim of Lithuania's Independence".

The monument stood in Taučiūnai until 1962, when it was demolished by order of the Kėdainiai Communist Party Committee, the plot was plowed and planted with beets. In 1989, in commemoration of the 70th anniversary of Povilas Lukšys' death, a wooden cross was erected in this place. On 16 February 1993, the monument was rebuilt. The monument was also consecrated.

A monument to Lukšys was also built in the garden of the Vytautas the Great War Museum in Kaunas.

Awards 
 Order of the Cross of Vytis, First Class (1923, awarded posthumously).

Sources

Bibliography

External links 
 The unveiling ceremony of the monument to Povilus Lukšys on September 15, 1929
 Monumental stone in the Kazokai village 

Lithuanian military personnel
1886 births
1919 deaths
Recipients of the Order of the Cross of Vytis